Fan Gang (born in 1953) is one of China's most prominent economists and one of China's most active reform advocates. He is currently based in Beijing, serving as a professor at the Graduate School of Chinese Academy of Social Sciences (CASS) and at the Peking University HSBC Business School, as well as the director of China's National Economic Research Institute (NERI). He is also the Secretary-General of the China Reform Foundation.

Biography
Dr. Fan serves as an advisor to numerous organizations, including the Monetary Policy Committee of the People's Bank of China. He is a well-respected expert in the macroeconomics of long-term development, international trade and currency, foreign relations and China's regional integration within Asia. He is most renowned for addressing such topics as China's financial risk and financial systems reform, foreign exchange regimes and revaluation, China's economic reform, and globalization.

Education
Dr. Fan Gang graduated from the Economics Department at Hebei University with a political economics major in 1982. Fan then studied Western economics in the Economics Department of the Graduate School of Chinese Academy of Social Sciences from 1982 to 1985. He subsequently spent two years as a visiting fellow at Harvard University and the US National Bureau of Economic Research from 1985 to 1987 and received his Ph.D. in Economics from the Graduate School of the Chinese Academy of Social Sciences in 1988.

Publications
Dr. Fan has written over 100 academic papers, over 200 articles for magazines and newspapers worldwide along with eight books on macroeconomics and the economics of transition. He now regularly writes a monthly series called "Enter the Dragon" exclusively for the public-benefit corporation Project Syndicate. In "Enter the Dragon," Dr. Fan examines the trends that are shaping China’s economy – and spells out what they mean for the rest of the world.

Notable Positions and Achievements

Present
Director, National Economic Research Institute 
Secretary-General, China Reform Foundation 
President, China Development Institute
Professor, Graduate School of Chinese Academy of Social Sciences
Professor, Peking University HSBC Business School
Member, Advisory Committee of the Ministry of Labor and Social Security of China
Member, Advisory Committee of the Hong Kong Center for Monetary Policy
Member, Monetary Policy Committee of the People's Bank of China
Advisor, State Foreign Exchange Administration of China
International Advisor, Center for International Development, Harvard University
Non-Executive Director, Ping An Insurance Company of China, Ltd.
Fellow of the World Economic Forum (since 1994)
Fellow of the Chinese Economist Society (USA; since 1993)
Consultant to the World Bank, the United Nations Development Programme (UNDP), the United Nations Economic Social and Commission for Asia and the Pacific (ESCAP), and to the Organisation for Economic Co-operation and Development (OECD)

2008 
Dr. Fan Gang ranked 33rd in the "World's Top 100 Public Intellectuals" by both Foreign Policy and Prospect magazines.

1995 
Dr Fan Gang awarded 'Global Leader for Tomorrow' by the World Economic Forum in Davos.

See also
Graduate School of Chinese Academy of Social Sciences

References

External links
 www.neri.org.cn Fan Gang's profile 
 Speaking Agent - The Insight Bureau

1953 births
Living people
People's Republic of China economists
Hebei University alumni
Academic staff of Peking University
Educators from Beijing
Economists from Beijing